Hrafn Gunnlaugsson (born 17 June 1948) is an Icelandic film director. He is the brother of mathematician Þorvaldur Gunnlaugsson and the lawyer Snædís Gunnlaugsdóttir and the actress Tinna Gunnlaugsdóttir. He is mostly known for his series of Viking films, sometimes called "Cod Westerns". He was married to Edda Kristjánsdóttir and they have four children: Kristján born 1968 who is a poet and playwright, Tinna who is an actress, Sól who is an art designer and Örk who is an artist and was born in 1993. He won the award for Best Director at the 20th Guldbagge Awards for When the Raven Flies.

Filmography
 Áramótaskaupið (1974 edition)
 Óðal feðranna (1981)
 Inter Nos (1982)
 Hrafninn flýgur (When the Raven Flies) (1984)
 Middle Ages Now (Bödeln och skökan) (1986)
 Í skugga hrafnsins (In the Shadow of the Raven) (1988)
 Hvíti víkingurinn (The White Viking) (1991)
 Hin helgu vé (The Sacred Mound) (1993)
 Myrkrahöfðinginn (TV-series "Prince of Darkness")(2000)
 Reykjavík í öðru ljósi (2000)
 Opinberun Hannesar (2004)
 Orðstír (In development)

References

External links
 
 Hrafn Gunnlaugsson's Production Company (accessed 26/11/06)

1948 births
Living people
Hrafn Gunnlaugsson
Hrafn Gunnlaugsson
Hrafn Gunnlaugsson
Best Director Guldbagge Award winners